Fern Valley might refer to:

Arboretums
Fern Valley, a section of the Edith J. Carrier Arboretum in Harrisonburg, Virginia
Fern Valley Native Plant Collections, one of the major gardens in the United States National Arboretum

Locations

Australia
Fern Valley homestead, see List of homesteads in Western Australia: D–F

Canada
Fern Valley Trailer Park, Alberta

United Kingdom
Fern Valley, a valley overseen by the National Trust of Jersey

United States
Fern Valley, California
Fern Valley Township, Palo Alto County, Iowa